Esteban Marino (May 26, 1914 – January 10, 1999) was a Uruguayan football referee. He refereed in the Primera División de Uruguay. 

He is most famous for refereeing the first leg of the 1968 Copa Libertadores finals and one match in the 1954 FIFA World Cup. As a World Cup linesman he oversaw one match in the 1950 World Cup and three matches in 1962. He died in January 1999 at the age of 84.

References

1914 births
1999 deaths
1954 FIFA World Cup referees
FIFA World Cup referees
Uruguayan football referees